Victor Alberto Arbelaez (14 August 1953 – 11 October 2007) was a Colombian professional soccer player and coach.

Career
Born in Bogotá in 1953, Arbelaez moved to the United States in 1966. He attended the University of San Francisco, where he won the 1975 NCAA championship. He played professionally for San Diego Jaws, Sacramento Spirits, Las Vegas Quicksilvers, San Diego Sockers, Pittsburgh Spirit, Las Vegas Seagulls and Phoenix Fire. In 1980 he was contracted to play with ASL expansion team the Phoenix Fire, but the team folded in pre-season.

After retiring as a player he worked as an assistant coach at the University of Nevada, Las Vegas and as head coach of Bishop Gorman High School.

He died on 11 October 2007, aged 54.

References

1953 births
2007 deaths
Colombian footballers
San Diego Jaws players
Sacramento Gold (1976–1980) players
Las Vegas Quicksilver players
San Diego Sockers (NASL) players
Pittsburgh Spirit players
Las Vegas Seagulls players
Phoenix Fire (soccer) players
North American Soccer League (1968–1984) players
Major Indoor Soccer League (1978–1992) players
Association football forwards
Colombian expatriate footballers
Colombian expatriates in the United States
Expatriate soccer players in the United States
Footballers from Bogotá